The En-Gedi Scroll is an ancient Hebrew parchment found in 1970 at Ein Gedi, Israel. Radiocarbon testing dates the scroll to the third or fourth century CE (210–390 CE), although paleographical considerations suggest that the scrolls may date back to the first or second century CE. This scroll was discovered to contain a portion of the biblical Book of Leviticus, making it the earliest copy of a Pentateuchal book ever found in a Holy Ark. The deciphered text fragment is identical to what was to become, during the Middle Ages, the standard text of the Hebrew Bible, known as the  Masoretic Text, which it precedes by several centuries, and constitutes the earliest evidence of this authoritative text version. Damaged by a fire in approximately 600 CE, the scroll is badly charred and fragmented and required noninvasive scientific and computational techniques to virtually unwrap and read, which was completed in 2015 by a team led by Prof. Seales of the University of Kentucky.

Discovery
The En-Gedi Scroll was discovered in a 1970 excavation headed by Dan Barag and Ehud Netzer of the Institute of Archaeology at Hebrew University, and Yosef Porath of the Israel Antiquities Authority at the ancient synagogue in Ein Gedi in Israel, the site of an ancient Jewish community. It was found in the burned remains of a Torah Ark in the ruins of the ancient synagogue at Ein Gedi. Severely damaged by a fire around 600 CE, the scroll appeared as burned, crushed chunks of charcoal. Each disturbance caused the scroll to disintegrate, leaving few options for conservation or restoration. The scroll fragments were preserved by the Israel Antiquities Authority (IAA), although for decades after their discovery the scrolls remained in storage due to their severely damaged condition.

Text
According to radiocarbon testing performed by the Israel Antiquities Authority, the scroll has a probability of 88.9% of dating to 210-390 CE and 68.2% of dating to 235-340 CE. The scroll was written at Ein Gedi where there was a community of Essenes, the Jewish sect made famous for their probable association with the Dead Sea Scrolls.

The text deciphered so far consists of 18 complete lines and 17 partial lines of the first two chapters of Leviticus. The text is identical to the medieval era Masoretic Text, unlike the Dead Sea scrolls which have variations from the Masoretic. Michael Segal of the Hebrew University of Jerusalem described the scroll as being the earliest evidence of the exact form of the Masoretic Text.

Recovery
The ancient scroll was discovered in 1970 but was in such fragile state it disintegrated on touch and so was unable to be studied. This led scientists to search for non-traditional techniques to reconstruct the text of the document virtually. This search led to the development of a virtual unwrapping technique developed by Prof. Seales of the University of Kentucky, which allowed scientists to virtually reveal the text contained in the En-Gedi scroll in 2015.

The virtual unwrapping process begins with using X-ray microtomography (micro-CT) to scan the damaged scroll. This scan is non-invasive and uses the same technology as a traditional CT scan. In this scan, researchers used a high energy x-ray beam to pass through the depth of the scroll. Each material in the scroll will absorb the x-ray radiation differently, where the scroll will absorb this radiation minimally but more than the empty space around it, and the ink will absorb this radiation significantly more than the scroll around it. This creates the sharp contrast we see between the text and the scroll in the final images of the virtually unwrapped scroll. When the scroll completes a full rotation with respect to the x-ray source, the computer generates a 2D slice of the cross-section, and performing this iteratively allows the computer to build up a 3D volumetric scan describing the density as a function of the position inside the scroll. The only data needed for the virtual unwrapping process is this volumetric scan, so after this point the scroll was safely returned to its protective archive. The density distribution is stored by the computer with corresponding positions, called voxels or volume-pixels. The goal of the virtual unwrapping process is to determine the layered structure of the scroll and try to peel back each layer while keeping track of which voxel is being peeled and what density it corresponds to. By transforming the voxels from a 3D volumetric scan to a 2D image, the writing on this inside is revealed to the viewer. This process happens in three steps: segmentation, texturing and flattening.

Segmentation 
The first stage of the virtual unwrapping process, segmentation, involves identifying geometric models for the structures within the virtual scan of the scroll. Because of the extensive damage, the parchment has become deformed and no longer has a clearly cylindrical geometry. Instead, some portions may look planar, some conical, some triangular, etc. Therefore, the most efficient way to assign a geometry to the layer is to do so in a piecewise fashion. Rather than modeling the complex geometry of the entire layer of the scroll, the piecewise model breaks each layer into more regular shapes that are easy to work with. This makes it easy to virtually lift off each piece of the layer one at a time. Because each voxel is ordered, peeling off each layer will preserve the continuity of the scroll structure.

Texturing 
The second stage, texturing, focuses on identifying intensity values that correspond with each voxel using texture mapping. From the micro-CT scan, each voxel has an associated brightness value that corresponds to a higher density. Since the metallic ink is denser than the carbon-based parchment, the ink will appear bright compared to the paper. After virtually peeling off the layers during the segmentation process, the texturing step matches the voxels of each geometric piece to their corresponding brightness value so that an observer is able to see the text written on each piece. In ideal cases, the scanned volume will match perfectly with the surface of each geometric piece and yield perfectly rendered text, but there are often small errors in the segmentation process that generate noise in the texturing process. Because of this, the texturing process usually includes nearest-neighbor interpolation texture filtering to reduce the noise and sharpen the lettering.

Flattening 
After segmentation and texturing, each piece of the virtually deconstructed scroll is ordered and has its corresponding text visualized on its surface. This is, in practice, enough to ‘read’ the inside of the scroll, but for the arts and antiquities world, it is often best to convert this to a 2D flat image to demonstrate what the scroll’s parchment would have looked like if they could physically unravel without damage. This requires the virtual unwrapping process to include a step that converts the curved 3D geometric pieces into flat 2D planes. To do so, the virtual unwrapping models the points on the surface of each 3D piece as masses connected by springs where the springs will come to rest only when the 3D pieces are perfectly flat. This technique is inspired by the mass-spring systems traditionally used to model deformation.

After segmenting, textualizing, and flattening the scroll to obtain 2D text fragments, the last step is a merge step meant to reconcile each individual segment to visualize the unwrapped parchment as a whole. This involves two parts: texture merging and mesh merging.

Texture Merging 
Texture merging aligns the textures from each segment to create a composite. This process is fast and gives feedback on the quality of the segmentation and alignment of each piece. While this is good enough to create a basic image of what the scroll looks like, there are some distortions which arise because each segment is individually flattened. Therefore, this is the first step in the merging process, used to check if the segmentation, texturing, and flattening processes were done correctly, but does not produce a final result.

Mesh Merging 
Mesh merging is more precise and is the final step in visualizing the unwrapped scroll. This type of merging recombines each point on the surface of each segment with the corresponding point on its neighbor segment to remove the distortions due to individual flattening. This step also re-flattens and re-textures the image to create the final visualization of the unwrapped scroll, and is computationally expensive compared to the texture merging process detailed above.

Using each of these steps, the computer is able to transform the voxels from the 3D volumetric scan and their corresponding density brightnesses to a 2D virtually unwrapped image of the text inside.

See also
 Herculaneum papyri

References

3rd-century biblical manuscripts
Ancient Jewish history
Archaeological corpora
Archaeological discoveries in Israel
Essene texts
Hebrew manuscripts
Judea
1970 archaeological discoveries